Statistics of American Soccer League II in season 1942–43.

Metropolitan Division

New England Division

The league went dormant for this and the following season.

References

American Soccer League (1933–1983) seasons
Amer